On the night of 27 January 2019, at 20:20 CST, an unusually violent and destructive tornado ripped through the Cuban capital Havana. The EF4 tornado toppled trees and utility poles, destroyed cars and sent debris flying as it passed through the city. According to the Cuban Meteorology Institute, the tornado was produced by a cold front that struck the nation's north coast, but "there were no indications of the anticipated existence of any cloud that fulfilled the characteristics of a classic supercell, nor a minisupercell, and that would explain the development of the intense tornado". At least eight people died and more than 190 were injured.

Background
Tornadoes in Cuba are not a rare occurrence as the island nation has been struck before in its history; the first ever filmed tornado was located in Cuba in 1933. Many of Cuba's tornadoes have intensity ratings of F0 to F2 on the Fujita scale. However, six F3 and three F4 tornadoes have been observed.

Tornado
At 20:20 local time, a tornadic vortex formed near Casino Deportivo, in the Cerro municipality. By that time, the tornado had significantly weakened and was dissipating. It was assigned an official rating of EF4 on the Enhanced Fujita scale by the Cuban Meteorology Institute, making this the first F4 or EF4 tornado in Cuba since 1940.

Damage
The tornado inflicted the greatest damage in the central and eastern parts of Havana, where numerous well-built masonry homes and businesses were damaged or destroyed. Concrete frame buildings sustained major structural damage, and cars were thrown or crushed under debris. The municipalities most affected were Diez de Octubre, Cerro, Guanabacoa, Regla, and San Miguel del Padrón. At least 1,238 of the 4,800 homes affected were seriously damaged, with 500 totally destroyed and 757 partially. At least 224 homes had completely lost their roof and 124 lost part of it. Nineteen medical infrastructures suffered extensive damage, including polyclinics, general practitioner clinics, nursing homes and pharmacies. The Obstetrics-Gynecology Teaching Hospital sustained the worst damage. Another hospital; the Hijas de Galicia Maternity Hospital was also damaged, and patients and staff had to be evacuated. Eighty schools were also structurally affected. Many school buildings suffered structural damage to roofs and walls. A further 21 day care facilities were damaged, and numerous trees and power poles were snapped along the path.

Casualties
Early reports by President Miguel Díaz-Canel said there were three deaths and 172 injures in a Twitter post. Later, according to Reuters, eight people were killed and over 190 were injured. Ten people suffered life-threatening injuries. Among the fatalities was a 54-year-old woman who died when the tornado tore through her house while searching for a shelter to hide in. Another man died when his home collapsed onto him. Two people initially hospitalized also succumbed to their injuries. The United Nations Office for the Coordination of Humanitarian Affairs and UN Cuban headquarters reported that 253,682 were directly affected by the destructive tornado, with 80,000 people in the direct path. Of the 9,937 people evacuated, at least 9,413 were living in the homes of friends and families while 524 were placed in government shelters. Over 144,000 residents did not have access to electricity after the disaster,; some still remained without power over a week later.

Response
Rescue and recovery operations began immediately after the tornado. On 27 January, at 20:00, President Bermúdez arranged a meeting with the Council of Ministers to discuss the progress made on recovery efforts. He was informed by ministers of the damage and casualties in the affected areas. Private businesses were also involved in the provision and distribution of basic needs such as clothing and food to needing individuals. Several musical artists organized benefit concerts and personally distributed aid to the affected.

See also
List of North American tornadoes and tornado outbreaks

References

Tornado Havana
Havana Tornado
Tornado Havana
Tornado Havana
Tornado 2019
Havana Tornado
Havana Tornado
Havana
Havana Tornado